Dolenja Podgora is a settlement in the hills southwest of Črnomelj in the White Carniola area of southeastern Slovenia. The area is part of the traditional region of Lower Carniola and is now included in the Southeast Slovenia Statistical Region.

A site of an Eneolithic settlement with evidence of occupation also in Late Antiquity has been found in the Židovec area near the village.

References

External links
Dolenja Podgora on Geopedia

Populated places in the Municipality of Črnomelj